The Old Franklin County Jail is a historic jail located at Chambersburg in Franklin County, Pennsylvania. It was built in 1818, and is a two-story, brick building with a slate covered hipped roof topped by a cupola.  The original building measures 84 feet wide by 48 feet deep.  In 1880, a cell block was added.  The jail yard is divided into two sections and surrounded by a 20-foot-high wall. At least seven prisoners were hanged on the premises.

Now known as the Old Jail, the building houses a museum and genealogical library operated by the Franklin County Historical Society - Kittochtinny.

It was listed on the National Register of Historic Places in 1970. It is included in the Chambersburg Historic District.

References

External links

 Franklin County Historical Society - Kittochtinny - official site

Jails in Pennsylvania
Museums in Franklin County, Pennsylvania
History museums in Pennsylvania
Buildings and structures in Franklin County, Pennsylvania
Government buildings completed in 1818
Jails on the National Register of Historic Places in Pennsylvania
National Register of Historic Places in Franklin County, Pennsylvania
History of Franklin County, Pennsylvania
Individually listed contributing properties to historic districts on the National Register in Pennsylvania